Soriano  may refer to:

 Soriano (surname), a Spanish-language surname

Places
Palma Soriano, Cuba
Soriano Calabro, Italy
Soriano nel Cimino, Italy
Soriano, former name of the town of Colón, Querétaro, Mexico
Villa Soriano, Uruguay
Soriano Department, Uruguay

Other
A Soriano Aviation, Philippine airline
Soriano (film), a 1999 documentary film by Eduardo Montes-Bradley

See also
 Saint Dominic in Soriano, a miraculous portrait associated with Soriano, Calabro